Rani Gunj is a major Urban Area in Secunderabad, India.

Transport
There are many buses run by TSRTC that connect to Hyderabad and Secunderabad. This locality has a major bus depot. The closest MMTS Train station is at James Street.

Neighbourhoods in Hyderabad, India

Geography of Secunderabad